Alice Brown Caine ( Brown; also known as Mrs. W. S. Caine; February 21, 1849 – January 28, 1918) was an English temperance leader. She served as president of the Women's Total Abstinence Union, the Liverpool Ladies' Temperance Association, and the Deaconesses' National Total Abstinence League.

Early life and education
Alice Brown was born in Liverpool, England, February 21, 1849. A daughter of Alice Chibnal Brown (nee Sirett; 1821-1863) and the Baptist preacher, the Rev. Hugh Stowell Brown (1823-1886), she developed a profound sympathy with the efforts against the liquor traffic. Caine had six younger siblings, Robert, Hugh, John, Dora, Bertha, and Eleanor.

She was educated privately in Liverpool.

Career

In 1868, she married William Sproston Caine, a prominent iron merchant and active temperance leader, and afterward Member of Parliament. A painting by Edwin Long of Mrs. Caine and her eldest daughter hung in the dining room of the family home in Clapham Common.

The couple devoted time, energy, and their substantial means to the cause.

Caine was introduced and spoke briefly at the Third Biennial Convention and Executive Committee Meetings of the World's Woman's Christian Temperance Union in London in June 1895, where she represented the Girls' Guild of Good Life.

She was affiliated with a number of temperance organizations, becoming president of the Women's Total Abstinence Union, and also of the Auxiliary of the Free Church Council. Caine was also an active member of the Committee of the Young Abstainers' Union, besides holding membership and official relations in various other subordinate organizations; for example, Caine served as president of Deaconesses' National Total Abstinence League, federated to the Women's Total Abstinence Union. One of her most responsible positions was that of treasurer of the Anglo-Indian Temperance Association, of which her husband was the founder; and she assumed that additional office after his death in 1903.

An interesting and convincing lecturer, she also wielded influence in the various social circles where much of her effective work was done.

Personal life

Mr. and Mrs. Caine had five children:
 Hannah Caine Roberts, who married John Herbert Roberts, M.P., Denbighshire
 Dorothea ("Dora") Caine, M.D., Medical Officer, Victoria Hospital for Children, Hull; honorary appointments in connection with the Royal Free Hospital and the New Hospital for Women, London
 Ruth Herbert Lewis, English temperance activist and collector of Welsh folk songs, who married John Herbert Lewis, M.P., Flintshire
 William Caine, author
 David Caine

Alice Brown Caine died in London, January 28, 1918. A memorial service was held in her honor at Wheatsheaf Hall on February 10, 1918.

References

1849 births
1918 deaths
English temperance activists
People from Liverpool